Sainey Sambou (born February 2, 1992) is a Gambian footballer who currently plays for Brikama United FC and the Gambia national football team. Sambou has five caps for Gambia.

He played in the 2009 African U-17 Championship, where they won first place.

References

Living people
1992 births
Gambian footballers
The Gambia international footballers
The Gambia youth international footballers
Association football midfielders
Brikama United FC players